The Morocco Tennis Tour – Tanger was a professional tennis tournament played on outdoor red clay courts. It was part of the ATP Challenger Tour in 2009, 2010, and 2013, and the ATP Challenger Series in 2008. The tournament was held in Tangier, Morocco.

Past finals

Singles

Doubles

External links
Morocco Tennis Tour official website

 
ATP Challenger Tour
Clay court tennis tournaments
 
Tennis tournaments in Morocco